Hericium americanum, commonly known as the bear's head tooth fungus, is an edible mushroom in the tooth fungus group. It was described as new to science in 1984 by Canadian mycologist James Herbert Ginns. 

Hericium americanum are commonly found on decaying trees in the Northern United States and Canada. This fungus grows exceptionally well in the environment of temperate deciduous forests.

References

External links

Russulales
Edible fungi
Fungi described in 1984
Fungi of North America